The name cardinal beetle typically refers to three different species of beetles. The red-headed or 'common' cardinal beetle (Pyrochroa serraticornis) is a red to orange beetle with, as the name suggests, a red head. The rarer black-headed cardinal beetle (P. coccinea), similarly found at sites across Britain, is larger and a deeper blood red. The scarce cardinal is only found at a few sites in Scotland and Wales.

Cardinal beetles prey on other insects, while their bright red colour prevents them being the target of other predators which believe them to be toxic.

Habitat
Red-headed cardinal beetles are normally found at the edges of woodland. Adults of this variety usually emerge around May in England, when they tend to be found under loose bark on deciduous trees. Fallen and standing timber and rotting stumps may also host this species. As the weather gets warmer, they disperse and are often found on dense, low herbage.
They bask for long periods on large leaves often near water – the Grand Union Canal being one particular hotspot.

Identification
People often mistake the smaller scarlet lily beetle, Lilioceris lilii, for a cardinal beetle as they also have a black underside and wings that are spotless and red. However, the scarlet lily leaf beetle's wing cases have tiny dimples and are shinier and more rounded than the dull, narrow, flattened and elongated cardinal beetle. The beetles can also be distinguished by the cardinal's toothed antennae. Another difference between the two is their diets. Scarlet lily leaf beetles are herbivores and are usually found eating lily leaves, whereas cardinal beetles are usually found on tree bark and flowers and feed on flying insects.

References

Tenebrionoidea
Articles containing video clips
Beetles described in 1762
Taxa named by Carl Linnaeus
Insect common names